Yanga Ntshakaza (born October 17, 1987), professionally known as Yanga Chief (or mononymously as Yanga) is a South African rapper, record producer and singer-songwriter. Born in Mthatha  and raised in  Queenstown, Yanga studied film studies at University of Johannesburg.

Career 
In late 2000s, Yanga  was a videographer for Buttabing Entertainment. In 2016, he co-written Kwesta's song featuring Thabsie "Ngyaz’fela Ngawe" released in February 26, 2016.  Yanga wrote and provided vocals for AKA’s song "Jika" released in 2018. In October 2018, his single "Utatakho" was released. The song peak number one on Metro FM Top 40 charts and was certified gold in South Africa selling  over 10 000 units. "Utatakho" won Song of the Year at the South African Hip Hop Awards 2019. Yanga made "Utatakho"(remix) the song features the late South African rapper Ricky Rick,Dee Koala and Boity. Yanga ranked number 3 on MTV Base Hottest MC in 2019. In October 2019, his Extended Play Becoming a Pop Star was released. Becoming a Pop Star won Best Hip Hop Album at 26th South African Music Awards.

Yanga began to work on his debut in 2017. On October 16, 2020, album's pre-add were made available.

On November 27, 2020, his  debut studio album Pop Star was released in South Africa. The album received positive reviews from music critics.

He teamed up with Blxckie and 25K on single "Ntoni Na", which music video premiered on MTV Base on the 31st of August 2021.In 2022 he made a single called "Benjamins" where he features Emtee and Henny Belit.

Awards and nominations

References

External links 
  

Living people
1987 births
South African rappers
South African hip hop musicians
Xhosa people
South African record producers